Citicasters Tower Holiday is a  guy-wired aerial mast for the transmission of FM radio and television programs in Holiday, Florida, United States. Citicasters Tower Holiday was built in 1996. This tower is located nearby another tower owned by Pacific and Southern Company.  The Pacific Co. tower is used for similar purposes, and although it is older than the Citicasters tower, they bare a striking comparison in both height and appearance.

Due to the height of this tower, as well as its twin tower, they can be seen with the naked eye from as far away as 15 miles or more in most cases.

See also
 List of masts

External links
  — Citicasters Tower
  — Pacific Co. Tower

Radio masts and towers in the United States
Towers in Florida
1996 establishments in Florida
Towers completed in 1996
Buildings and structures in Pasco County, Florida